Thysanocarpus is a small genus of plants in the family Brassicaceae known generally as fringepods or lacepods. These are small, erect annual herbs. The flat fruit capsule is generally round or oval-shaped with a wing that goes all the way around the pod, giving it a fringed look. The fruits hang from most of the length of the stem. The plants are native to the western United States.

Selected species:
Thysanocarpus conchuliferus - Santa Cruz Island fringepod
Thysanocarpus curvipes - sand fringepod
Thysanocarpus laciniatus - mountain fringepod
Thysanocarpus radians - ribbed fringepod

References

External links
 Jepson Manual Treatment

Brassicaceae
Brassicaceae genera